Lori McCann is an American politician serving as a member of the Idaho House of Representatives from the 6A district. McCann assumed office on May 17, 2021, appointed by Governor Brad Little to succeed Aaron von Ehlinger.

Early life and education 
A native of Lewiston, Idaho, McCann graduated from Lewiston High School. She then earned a Bachelor of Science degree in education from the University of Idaho.

Career 
Prior to entering politics, McCann was the director of paralegal and legal assistant programs at Lewis–Clark State College. She also helped manage her family's law firm and McCann Ranch and Livestock Co., a livestock and commercial real estate business.

References 

Women state legislators in Idaho
Republican Party members of the Idaho House of Representatives
People from Lewiston, Idaho
People from Nez Perce County, Idaho
University of Idaho alumni
Lewis–Clark State College faculty
Businesspeople from Idaho
Living people
Year of birth missing (living people)
21st-century American women